John Bruce may refer to: 

 Sir John Bruce, 2nd Baronet (before 1671–1711), Commissioner to the Parliament of Scotland; MP
 John Bruce (historiographer) (1745–1826), Scottish politician, East India Company historiographer and Secretary to the Board of Control
 John Bruce (minister) (1794–1880), senior Scottish minister of both the Church of Scotland and Free Church of Scotland
 John Bruce (antiquary) (1802–1869), English founder of the Camden Society
 John Bruce (British Army officer) (1808–1870), acting Governor of Western Australia
 John Bruce (judge) (1832–1901), U.S. federal judge
 John Bruce (Canada) (1837–1893), first president of the Métis provisional government
 John Bruce (surgeon) (1905–1975), Scottish surgeon
 John Bruce (decorator), one of the designers on The Learning Channel's show While You Were Out
 John Asamoah Bruce, Ghanaian air force officer
 John Collingwood Bruce (1805–1892), English nonconformist minister and historian
 John E. Bruce (1856–1924), American lawyer, politician, and baseball executive
 John Edward Bruce (1856–1924), African American slave, writer and nationalist leader
 John Mitchell Bruce (1846–1929), British physician
 John Munro Bruce (1840–1901), Australian businessman
 John Leck Bruce (1850–1921), Scottish-born architect and sanitary engineer
 John Gregory Bruce (1897–1985), United States Tax Court judge

See also
 John Bruce-Gardyne (1930–1990), Baron; Conservative MP for Angus, Scotland
 John Bruce Glasier (1859–1920), British Independent Labour Party politician
 John Bruce Thompson (born 1951), American attorney and anti-game advocate
 Jack Bruce (1943–2014), Scottish musician, composer and vocalist